The whitemouth shiner (Notropis alborus) is a species of fish in the family Cyprinidae, the carps and minnows. It is native to the eastern United States, where it occurs in the Piedmont in the states of Virginia, North Carolina, and South Carolina.

The species was described in 1947 from a creek that joins the Deep River in Randolph County, North Carolina.

References 

Notropis
Fish of the United States
Fish described in 1947